Nyaribare Chache is an electoral constituency in Kenya. It is one of nine constituencies in Kisii County. The constituency was established for the 1988 elections from the larger Nyaribari constituency to form two constituencies of nyaribari chache and masaba.

Members of Parliament 

Nyaribari Chache Constituency has six wards namely; Kisii Central, Bobaracho, Keumbu, Kiogoro, Birongo and Ibeno.

Kisii Central Sub-county
Kisii Central Sub-county shares common boundaries with Nyaribari Chache Constituency. It is also within the sub-county that Kisii Town is situated. The Sub-county is headed by the sub-county administrator, appointed by a County Public Service Board.

References 

Constituencies in Kisii County
Constituencies in Nyanza Province
1988 establishments in Kenya
Constituencies established in 1988